William Bruce Cameron (born July 25, 1956) is an American author, columnist, and humorist. Cameron is most famous for his novel A Dog's Purpose, which spent 52 weeks on the New York Times bestseller list. The book is the basis for the movie version starring Dennis Quaid, Britt Robertson, Peggy Lipton, K.J. Apa, Juliet Rylance, Luke Kirby, John Ortiz, and Pooch Hall, and released in theaters on January 27, 2017. A Dog's Purpose is followed by a sequel called A Dog's Journey, which Cameron, along with Cathryn Michon, adapted into a film of the same name.

His books have been translated into over 60 languages.

Life and career
Cameron was born in Petoskey, Michigan. He is also the author of the best-selling self-improvement book 8 Simple Rules for Dating My Teenage Daughter, which was later adapted into the short-lived ABC sitcom of the same name that aired from 2002 to 2005. His book 8 Simple Rules for Marrying My Daughter was released in 2008 and already had a Hollywood movie deal before its publication, with 89 Films and Wendy Finerman, producer of The Devil Wears Prada.

Cameron is also the author of How to Remodel a Man, which was excerpted in the August 2005 issue of O, The Oprah Magazine, and was the subject of the November 1, 2005 Oprah Show. His novel, A Dog's Purpose, was published July 2010 by Tom Doherty Associates. It was 19 weeks on The New York Times Best Seller list in its hardcover release. The softcover version was released May 24, 2011.  In total, A Dog's Purpose has spent a year on The New York Times Bestseller list (hardcover and paperback combined).

He wrote a weekly column for Creators Syndicate from 2001 until 2015 that appeared in around 50 newspapers in the U.S. and Canada, including Hawaii's MidWeek; "8 Simple Rules" told his humorous cautionary tales and memories of his life and was named after his bestselling book. In 2012, overwhelmed with other work, Cameron put it on hold after 689 editions.

Cameron's 2017 novel A Dog’s Way Home inspired the 2019 film of the same name.

The 2012 sequel to A Dog's Purpose, entitled A Dog's Journey, was adapted by Cameron and his wife, Cathryn Michon, into a film of the same name, directed by Gail Mancuso.

Bibliography 
A Dog's Purpose

A Dog's Purpose: A Novel for Humans, Forge (2010) 
A Dog's Journey, Forge (2012) 
A Dog's Promise, Forge (2019) 

A Dog's Way Home

 A Dog’s Way Home, Forge (2017) 
 A Dog's Courage, Forge (2021) 

Ruddy McCann

 The Midnight Dog of the Repo Man: A Short Story, Forge (2014) 
 The Midnight Plan of the Repo Man, Forge (2014) 
 Repo Madness, Forge (2016) 

Standalone Novels

Emory's Gift, Forge (2011) 
The Dogs of Christmas, Forge (2013) 
The Dog Master, Forge (2015) 
A Dog's Perfect Christmas, Forge (2020) 
Love, Clancy: Diary of a Good Dog, Forge (2023) 

For Young Readers

 A Dog's Purpose Puppy Tales
Ellie's Story, Starscape (2015) 
Bailey's Story, Starscape (2016) 
Molly's Story, Starscape (2017) 
Max's Story, Starscape (2018) 
Toby's Story, Starscape (2019) 
Cooper's Story, Starscape (2021) 
A Dog's Way Home Puppy Tales
Shelby's Story, Starscape (2018) 
Bella's Story, Starscape (2020) 
Lily's Story, Starscape (2019) 
Lily to the Rescue series
Lily to the Rescue (2020) 
Two Little Piggies (2020) 
The Not-So-Stinky Skunk (2020) 
Dog Dog Goose (2020) 
Lost Little Leopard (2021) 
The Misfit Donkey (2021) 
Foxes in a Fix (2021) 
The Three Bears (2021) 

Nonfiction

8 Simple Rules for Dating My Teenage Daughter, Workman (2001)
How to Remodel a Man, St. Martin's Press (2004)
8 Simple Rules for Marrying My Daughter, Touchstone (2008)
A Dad's Purpose, Amazon Digital Services (2017)

Awards 
 2006: The Robert Benchley Society Award for Humor
 2006: The National Society of Newspaper Columnists Award for Best Humor
 2011: Columnist of the Year National Society of Newspaper Columnists

References

External links 
 Cameron's official website

1960 births
Living people
People from Petoskey, Michigan
American columnists
American humorists
American male novelists